This is a complete list of seasons competed by the Montreal Alouettes, a Canadian Football League team.  The team was founded in 1946 as a member of the Interprovincial Rugby Football Union, and followed the rest of the IRFU into the CFL when it was founded in 1958. The franchise folded after the 1981 season, but a new team named the Concordes took their place in the East Division and inherited the Alouettes' history. That franchise was renamed the Alouettes in 1986 on the 40th anniversary of the inception of the Alouettes franchise. However, the Alouettes folded a day before the 1987 regular season began. 

The demise of the CFL's American expansion brought new life to professional football in Montreal. The owners of the Baltimore Stallions relocated to Montreal after the 1995 season and reconstituted themselves as the third incarnation of the Alouettes. The CFL does not consider the Stallions to be part of the Montreal franchise's continuity; rather, all Montreal teams since 1946 are included in the team's history. The Alouettes are now retconned as having suspended operations from 1987 to 1995. 

Throughout their history, the Alouettes have won seven Grey Cups, most recently in back-to-back years in 2009 and 2010.

Seasons